The Good Life is a 2006 novel written by Jay McInerney. A sequel to his 1992 novel, Brightness Falls, it takes place immediately before, during, and after the events of September 11, 2001.

External links
Review from The Observer
Another review from The Observer
Review from The Independent
Review from The New Yorker
Interview on Radio Four
The Good Life on Lower Manhattan Project, a French Canadian site dedicated to 9/11 culture.

2006 American novels

Novels about the September 11 attacks
Novels by Jay McInerney
Alfred A. Knopf books
Sequel novels
Books with cover art by Chip Kidd